Sarrigan (also Romanized as Sarrīgān and Sar Rīgān; also known as Sar Rīg) is a village in Howmeh Rural District, in the Central District of Minab County, Hormozgan Province, Iran. At the 2006 census, its population was 605, in 119 families.

References 

Populated places in Minab County